Blake's Lock is a lock situated on the River Kennet in Reading, Berkshire, England. It is on the short reach of the River Kennet which is administered as if it were part of the River Thames and is hence owned and managed by the Environment Agency.

History
The first mile of the Kennet from its junction with the River Thames has been navigable since the 13th century. Blake's Lock was originally a flash lock known as Brokenburglok. In 1404 the Abbot of Reading Abbey, who had control of the River Kennet, made an agreement with the town's guild to allow craft to pass through the lock between sunrise and sunset on payment of a one penny toll. By 1794, not much had changed, with John Rennie, the engineer of the Kennet and Avon Canal describing it as "a very bad and inconvenient staunch lock".

The lock was converted to a timber-constructed pound lock in 1802 to improve navigation from the Thames into the River Kennet enabling boats to travel all the way to the Bristol area. The lock retains its manual beams (not the originals, new beams were fitted in 2006), so far avoiding the progress towards hydraulic power. The lock was closed during winter 2017-18 for work that included repairing and re-sheeting the lock gates and refurbishing the chamber walls.

Riverside Museum at Blake's Lock

Next to the lock is the Riverside Museum at Blake's Lock which tells the story of Reading's two rivers — the Kennet and the Thames. The museum occupies two former industrial buildings, the Screen House and the Turbine House.  Exhibits include a gypsy caravan and information about the Romani people, a medieval mill wheel, preserved turbine machinery, and seasonal art exhibits.

See also

Locks on the River Thames
Locks on the Kennet and Avon Canal

References

Bibliography

External links

Riverside Museum at Blake's Lock

1802 establishments in England
Locks of Reading, Berkshire
Locks on the Kennet and Avon Canal
Buildings and structures completed in 1802